Jovan Uglješa Mrnjavčević (fl. 1346–1371), known as Jovan Uglješa, was a Serbian medieval nobleman of the Mrnjavčević family and one of the most prominent magnates of the Serbian Empire. He held the title of despot, received from Serbian Emperor Stefan Uroš V, whose co-ruler - Serbian King Vukašin was brother of Uglješa.

Life
Uglješa was the son of Mrnjava, a treasurer of Helen of Anjou, the queen consort of Stephen Uroš I of Serbia. He held Travunia in 1346, during the rule of Stefan Dušan (1331–1355).

Uglješa married Jelena (later nun Jefimija), daughter of Vojihna, the Caesar of Drama. This boosted the power of Uglješa, who would later govern the region alongside his father-in-law. Vojihna died in ca 1360, and his lands were inherited by Jovan Uglješa.

He was given the title of despotes by Empress Helena of Bulgaria in 1365. His province was situated along the lower course of the Struma with Serres as seat. His realm was under the religious jurisdiction of the Ecumenical Patriarchate of Constantinople since 1368. The Patriarch mentioned the master of Raška (another name for Serbia), Jovan Uglješa, in a letter from 1371.

Death and legacy
With the Ottoman threat rising in the Balkans, Jovan Ugleša and his brothers Vukašin Mrnjavčević and Gojko Mrnjavčević tried to oppose the Turks. Jovan Uglješa was killed on 26 September 1371 in the Battle of Maritsa. Their troops were smashed by those of Ottoman commanders Lala Shahin Pasha and Gazi Evrenos at the Battle of Maritsa in 1371. The defeat resulted in big portions of the region of Macedonia falling under Ottoman power. Additionally, two brothers were killed during the fight. Their courage and self-sacrifice made them heroes of Bulgarian and Serbian epic poetry.

See also
 House of Mrnjavčević
 Serbian epic poetry

References

Sources

 
 
 
 
 
 
 
 
 
 
 

1371 deaths
14th-century Serbian nobility
Ugljesa
Serbian Empire
Medieval Serbian military leaders
Serbian military personnel killed in action
Despots of the Serbian Empire
Characters in Serbian epic poetry
History of Serres
Year of birth unknown
14th-century soldiers
Boyars of Stefan Dušan